Israfil Ashurly (born January 16, 1969, in Baku, Azerbaijani SSR, USSR) is an azerbaijani mountaineer, executive secretary of the Ice-Climbing Commission (2010-2017) under the UIAA (International Climbing and Mountaineering Federation), president of the youth committee (Youth Commission 2012-2016) UIAA, president of the Azerbaijan Mountaineering Federation (2010-2016), Member of the Presidium of the Euro-Asian Association of Mountaineering and Climbing (EAMA since 2011), judge of the international category in ice climbing, master of sports of the Republic of Azerbaijan.

The first Azerbaijani is a conqueror of the Himalayan eight-thousanders: Chomolungma (2007), Kangchenjunga (2011), Lhotse (2019) and Manaslu (2019). Azerbaijan’s first member of the Seven Peaks club (2007), also the first Snow Leopard in the history of Azerbaijani mountaineering (2009) and the first conqueror of the North Pole (2009). The first of the Azerbaijanis landed in Antarctica in December 2005 and climbed the highest peak of the white continent - the Vinson Massif.

Co-founder of Azerbaijan Alpine Club / Azərbaycan Alpine Klubu / Azerbaijan Alpine Club.

On March 4, 2009, by Decree of the President of the Republic of Azerbaijan, Israfil Ashurly was awarded the Taraggi (Progress) medal.

Cavalier of the mountaineering Order "Edelweiss" I and II degrees.

Biography
He was born on January 16, 1969, in the city of Baku. Graduate of school number 6 in Baku. He graduated from Azerbaijan State Oil Academy's energy faculty.

In 1991, Israfil Ashurly organized the "Insol" company, which has been installing and launching telecommunication equipment for mobile and wireline operators since 1998. The company has offices in: Russia, Kazakhstan, Azerbaijan, Kyrgyzstan. Member of the Board of Managing Directors of the Insol Group of Companies. CEO of the management company "Insol Consulting".

Vice-President of the Swiss company iCsquared GmbH in Russia, the Baltic countries and the CIS. www.icsquared.ch

Israfil Ashurly became interested in mountaineering after "Insol" was created. This happened, as he said, by accident. In 1999, he made an exotic tourist trekking to the foot of Kanchenjunga (8586m) in the Himalayas.

“I didn’t understand how people go to the mountains, live in tents. My habits were quite sybaritic. ”

In the Indian state of Sikkim, he got to the five thousandth pass of Gocha La. Here is how Israfil describes his impressions:

"When people get to the mountains, they have two choices. Or they don’t like the mountains and they don’t go there at all anymore. Or they like it so much that they try as soon as possible to get there again. I have a second case".

Expeditions
In 2000, while on a holiday visit to near Kangchenjunga's foot, Ashurly became interested in mountaineering. In next seven years, he became ninth person to complete Seven Summits challenge.

Seven Summits

Snow Leopard Summits

Volcanic Seven Summits

Himalayas & Karakoram expeditions
In 2003, he reached Lapchi mountain (6,017) with Russian alpinist Vladimir Shatayev. In 2007, Ashurly reached Everest with Sergey Kofanov. In 2011, he reached Kangchenjunga with Russian alpinists Aleksey Bolotov and Nikolay Totmyanin.
2013 Nanga Parbat expedition. Expedition was interrupted by terrorist attack on base camp.
2014 Shishabangma expedition. Climbed till 6800m and moved down due to pulmonary edema.
2019 Lhotse expedition.
2019 Manaslu expedition.

See also
Murad Ashurly

References

External links
Azerbaijan Mountaineering Federation
Ashurly's Profile on 7 Summits Club

Living people
Azerbaijani mountain climbers
1969 births
Sportspeople from Baku
Businesspeople from Baku
Summiters of the Seven Summits
Azerbaijani sportsmen